The Smithfield Tabernacle is a historic tabernacle in Smithfield, Utah. It is one of only 42 surviving tabernacles, out of 92 built.

The building was built of yellow brick during more than 20 years, from 1881 to 1902.  It cost $77,000. It was used as a tabernacle until 1955, when it was renovated as a recreation facility and became known as the Youth Center. It was listed on the National Register of Historic Places in 2017.

References

Tabernacles (LDS Church)
National Register of Historic Places in Cache County, Utah
Buildings and structures completed in 1902